The 2007 Giro d'Italia began on 12 May, with Stage 11 occurring on 23 May. The route began in Caprera in Sardinia, with the first three stages being held on the island. These were followed by an unusually early rest day to transfer to Italy's mainland.

The first stage was a team time trial, a stage where each member of the team raced together against the clock. The Italian  team won this stage, but it was sprinter Enrico Gasparotto and not team leader Danilo Di Luca who was the first across the line and thus the first wearer of the pink jersey. Gasparotto and Di Luca traded the jersey back and forth over the next few days' flat stages.

Stage 6 featured a winning breakaway, and it accounted for the only time in the 2007 Giro when the Liquigas team did not hold the race leadership. Marco Pinotti and Luis Felipe Laverde were the last riders remaining from that day's morning escape, claiming the pink jersey and the stage win, respectively. Pinotti held the race leadership through the flat stages that followed, before yielding it to the Giro's oldest rider, Di Luca's Liquigas teammate Andrea Noè.

Italian sprinter Alessandro Petacchi of  won three of the first eleven stages of this Giro, but his subsequent disqualification for a non-negative salbutamol test after stage 11 nullified these victories.

Stage 1
12 May 2007 — Caprera to La Maddalena,  (team time trial)

This was the Giro's first visit to Sardinia since 1991. The course for the team time trial was technical, with many twists and turns in the road. It took the squads from Caprera on the island of Sardinia across a bridge to the tiny Maddalena island to the northwest.

They stopped the clock in 35'06".  was well on pace to knock them off, but a crash  from the finish line dashed any hopes of theirs for a stage win. Their fifth rider didn't cross the line until a minute after their first four had, and they finished 21st, better than only .  was the first team under 35 minutes, clocking in at 34'08", which would eventually be good for third on the day. Paolo Savoldelli's  team finished with only the minimum of five riders together, but their 33'51" was nearly good enough for the stage win. The big surprise of the day was that the first Liquigas rider across the line was not their team leader Danilo Di Luca, but rather sprinter Enrico Gasparotto. Di Luca was visibly upset to have not been granted first position as the squad approached the finish line. Though Gasparotto at first claimed it was the team's plan for him and not Di Luca to cross first, he later admitted that he had momentarily forgotten that the team's time was taken for the fifth rider across the line and not the first, explaining that he was simply excited to finish as quickly as possible once the finish line was in view. Along with the pink jersey, Gasparotto was awarded the white jersey for leading the youth classification; his teammate Vincenzo Nibali wore that jersey in stage 2.

Stage 2
13 May 2007 — Tempio Pausania to Bosa, 

Back on Sardinia, the first road race stage of the Giro was flat, heading west from Tempio Pausania along the Gulf of Asinara before going to the south and over the second-category Villanova Monteleone climb, which awarded the first green jersey. A sprint finish was the expectation.

Five riders broke free of the peloton after  of racing. These were Frédéric Bessy, Mauro Facci, Simone Masciarelli, Pavel Brutt and Arnaud Labbe. The time gap fell precipitously, despite Brutt's best effort to pace the breakaway. Brutt was the first over the Villanova Monteleone climb, and took the first green jersey on the podium after the stage. As the stage neared its conclusion, the teams of the primary sprinters joined in the chase. Brutt was the last rider left off the front. Gasparotto was among the riders to crash. Since the crash took place inside  to the finish line, all riders who fell were given the same time as the stage winner.

's fast man Robbie McEwen was 15 or 20 riders deep in the bunch during the descent from the small bump in the road that preceded the finish. He managed to find Petacchi's wheel, and held it while his team Milram executed a leadout in the stage's final kilometer. The veteran Aussie came around Petacchi for the stage win, holding off Paolo Bettini, who had done the same. As Gasparotto finished 43rd on the stage and his team leader Danilo Di Luca 12th, Di Luca took the pink jersey for stage 3, though all the Liquigas riders who finished together in the team time trial were still tied in the overall standings at this point.

Stage 3
14 May 2007 — Barumini to Cagliari, 

The third stage was also flat, starting in the south-central of Sardinia. It did not have any categorized climbs. It ended in Cagliari, with the last  on rough, uneven terrain. After this stage, the Giro took an uncommonly early rest day to transfer to Italy's mainland.

Right away, a five-man breakaway formed, instigated by Mikhail Ignatiev and Elio Aggiano. Their eventual mates were Mickaël Buffaz, Alexandre Pichot, and Giovanni Visconti. Their maximum advantage was 7'40", as the leading team  did not mount a strong chase for much of the stage. Ignatiev and Visconti were caught with  remaining after bravely fighting on as long as possible. Other inconsequential breakaway attempts took place in the next few minutes, but the group was all one for a mass finish, won by Alessandro Petacchi, though this was one of his many 2007 wins that was later stripped due to his irregular salbutamol test later in the race. Since Enrico Gasparotto contested the sprint and finished 74 places ahead of teammate and overnight race leader Danilo Di Luca, Gasparotto reclaimed the pink jersey while still holding the white. Nibali again wore the white jersey in his stead in the following stage.

Stage 4
16 May 2007 — Salerno to Montevergine di Mercogliano, 

After the transfer to the Italian mainland, the peloton faced a medium mountain stage that concluded with the first-category climb to Montevergine di Mercogliano. The finish was highly technical, with over a dozen switchbacks.

With  covered, 's Yuriy Krivtsov instigated the day's breakaway, being joined by mountains classification leader Pavel Brutt, who was looking to add to his lead in that standing. 's Markel Irizar joined them  later. While Brutt did get maximum points on the third-category Picco San Angelo climb, the route prior to the Montevergine di Mercogliano climb was mostly flat, and the -paced main field caught the trio shortly after the climb began. Julio Alberto Pérez attacked for the stage win with  left, and nearly held on to the finish line. With  left, a group of nine passed up Pérez and contested the stage finish among themselves. Danilo Di Luca took off for the line with  remaining to race. He had Riccardo Riccò and Damiano Cunego on his wheel, but neither came around him in the sprint, affording the  leader the stage win and, for the second time, the pink jersey. Di Luca had previously won a stage that ended on this climb in the 2001 Giro d'Italia. Being first on the category-one climb also gave Di Luca the green jersey; second-place man Riccò wore that jersey in the next two stages.

Stage 5
17 May 2007 — Teano to Frascati, 

Stage five was mostly flat, but a third-category climb  from the finish line had the potential to break up the field. The descent into the wine country town of Frascati was technical, covering twisting, turning roads to the finish line.

 rider Mikhail Ignatiev was the day's first escapee. Mickaël Buffaz joined him after , and the two quickly attained a five-minute advantage.  paced the main field for race leader Danilo Di Luca, and in the third hour of racing they tapped out a  pace, cutting significantly into the breakaway's time gap. When Ignatiev realized that the main field was closing in on them, he attacked and came free of Buffaz, trying to solo to the finish line, but he was caught  from the finish line. František Raboň, Matt White, Salvatore Commesso, and Elia Aggiano tried their luck within the final , but none stayed away for more than a few minutes, and the widely expected mass sprint took place. 's Angelo Furlan tried to execute a leadout for Thor Hushovd, but Alessandro Petacchi's train from  overran him. A chaotic sprint followed, with several riders having victory in their view. 's Robert Förster was the first over the line for the win.

Stage 6
18 May 2007 — Tivoli to Spoleto, 

This medium mountain stage had three climbs, one in each category. The first-category Monte Terminillo crested a little after the halfway point of the stage, and with two climbs in the next  afterward, pre-race analysis found this to be a stage conducive to a winning breakaway.

Daniele Contrini instigated the day's breakaway at that point, and Marco Pinotti, Christophe Kern, Hubert Schwab, and Luis Felipe Laverde joined him. The breakaway was riding cohesively through the Monte Terminillo climb, and the -led main field did not chase very hard to bring them back. Pinotti was the best-placed man in the break, 3'11" back of race leader Danilo Di Luca on the day. The group's advantage quickly exceeded three minutes, meaning Pinotti stood to become race leader if they stayed away. Laverde took the mountains points at the top of the Terminillo, and took the green jersey on the podium at day's end.

The group's advantage on the descent of the Terminillo was almost eight minutes, and it continued to rise for a time after that. Kern and Contrini had trouble keeping the pace with the leading group as the stage went on, with time trial specialist Pinotti setting a very fast pace. On the day's last climb, the second-category Forca d'Acero, Pinotti and Laverde distinguished themselves as the last remnants of the break, still seven minutes clear of the main field. Kern and Schwab were 90 seconds off the pace at the finish, with Contrini 3 minutes back. As the two leaders approached the finish line, Pinotti abided by an unwritten rule in cycling as he allowed Laverde to take the stage win, knowing that he (Pinotti) was going to take the overall race leadership. Alessandro Petacchi led the peloton home 7'09" behind Laverde.

Stage 7
19 May 2007 — Spoleto to Scarperia, 

This was a long, flat stage, winding through the regions of Umbria and Tuscany. It included the third-category Valico Croce a Mori, but this climb was a good  from the finish line, meaning it was unlikely to prevent a mass sprint from happening.

This was Elio Aggiano, and he drew with him Swiss time trial specialist Rubens Bertogliati, Beñat Albizuri, and Fabien Patanchon. After , they had 11 minutes on the main field. It was at this point that the teams of the sprinters set to making the chase. The time gap fell precipitously, and when Bertogliati topped Valico Croce a Mori in first position, the peloton was only one minute behind.  and in particular their leader, reigning world champion Paolo Bettini, had made an aggressive chase on the ascent to try to soften the field. With  left to race, the break was brought back into the main field. Matt White, Salvatore Commesso, and Fabian Cancellara tried to break away and solo to the finish line, but all were brought back. The  leadout train again delivered Alessandro Petacchi to the line first, though this was one of his many 2007 wins that was later stripped due to his irregular salbutamol test later in the race.

Stage 8
20 May 2007 — Barberino di Mugello to Fiorano Modenese, 

This stage had two distinct halves. The first was hilly, with two categorized climbs and several uncategorized rises in elevation. After descending from the third-category Sestola climb, the peloton took in a flat second half of the stage en route to Fiorano Modenese. Once there, the stage concluded with a lap on the Fiorano Circuit, the private test track for Ferrari sports cars. The stage commemorated 60 years since the introduction of the first Ferrari.

At the  mark,  rider Dario Cioni broke away, and instigated a big chase pack to come after him. Twenty-seven riders formed the day's principal break. The best-placed man in the group was ' Andrea Noè, who was 4' 47" back at the beginning of the day, meaning his position threatened that of race leader Marco Pinotti. The presence of Riccardo Riccò in the group meant that the peloton was likely to chase it down, as Riccò was an outside favorite for overall victory in the Giro. The other riders in the group repeatedly attacked to try to shed Riccò, and when his sporting director instructed him to drop back, Riccò rejoined the peloton. Five other riders also dropped back, leaving 21 out front. They worked cohesively to gain an advantage of seven minutes on the main field, keeping it at that gap for most of the stage. Pinotti's  set to making the chase, but no other team helped, as they were the only team who had a vested interest in limiting the escape group's time gap. One team pulling the peloton was no match for 21 riders working together, and it quickly became clear that the breakaway would not be caught. They managed to pull back three minutes by the time the riders reached the Ferrari race track, meaning Pinotti was narrowly able to retain the pink jersey. Various members of the 21-strong leading group tried to attack for the stage win, with ' Pavel Brutt away within the final kilometer, only to be overhauled by Emanuele Sella. Sella was in turn passed by world champion Paolo Bettini, but 's Kurt Asle Arvesen had ably held Bettini's wheel in the final kilometer and started his sprint at just the right time to win the stage. Pinotti's lead was reduced to under 30 seconds; he thanked teammates Lorenzo Bernucci, Axel Merckx and Aaron Olson for their hard pace-setting at the front of the peloton, but also noted that the team would need to ride better on subsequent days if they were to continue to keep the jersey.

Stage 9
21 May 2007 — Reggio Emilia to Lido di Camaiore, 

After the second-category Passo del Cerreto, the course descended almost all the way to sea level and was flat to the finish. The finish was in Camaiore on the Ligurian coast, in the Italian Riviera.

The peloton took it easy for most of this stage. Their pace through two hours of racing was a paltry . There was no significant breakaway in this time. Only the Passo del Cerreto climb spurred any combativity in the riders, as six, including mountains classification leader Luis Felipe Laverde broke away on the ascent. Four of them tried to soldier on for the stage win, but the teams of the sprinters, and the race leader's , worked well to keep the main field together.  tapped out a furious pace in the final  , reaching   and forcing the peloton to ride single file. They continued their leadout in the last kilometer, for Alessandro Petacchi, but it was Danilo Napolitano who took the stage win. The overall standings were unchanged by the day's results.

Stage 10
22 May 2007 — Camiaore to Santuario Nostra Signora della Guardia, 

This was a difficult stage, long and with a lot of climbing. Two categorized climbs on course preceded the first-category summit stage finish at Santuario Nostra Signora Della Guardia. The course headed northwest from Camaiore through the Cinque Terre on the Ligurian coast, finishing with a  climb with a steady 8% grade, and stretches reaching 14%.

In sharp contrast to the previous stage, the peloton rode very aggressively from the outset on this stage. Numerous breakaway attempts in the first two hours got free briefly, only to be brought back minutes later. The right move at the right time turned out to be Iván Parra, George Hincapie, Alberto Losada, Mauricio Ardila, Fortunato Baliani, and Hubert Dupont forming a six-rider break at the  mark. Their lead exceeded 4 minutes at times, and at those points Hincapie was the virtual race leader, having entered the day 3' 04" behind Marco Pinotti. This advantage did not last for very long, being whittled down by the pink jersey group. The day's hot weather also took its toll on Ardila and Dupont, as they fell from the leading group and into one of the various trailing groups on the road.

The leaders had one minute on the Pinotti group as the ascent of the day's penultimate climb began. Hincapie flatted and was gapped between the two groups as the time gap was so small that team cars were not allowed between them. He managed to bridge back up to the remaining leaders Baliani, Parra, and Losada. Pinotti was dropped from the main chase group on this climb, finishing 36th on the stage and losing the pink jersey. The  had been pacing this group when their leader Danilo Di Luca attacked, which caused all group dynamics to be abandoned. Leonardo Piepoli responded to Di Luca's move and drew Andy Schleck with him. Piepoli stayed away for the stage win after shedding Schleck moments later. Di Luca passed Schleck for second on the stage, and with that result he regained the leadership of the mountains classification. His teammate Andrea Noè, the oldest rider in the Giro, was the new race leader.

Stage 11
23 May 2007 — Serravalle Scrivia to Pinerolo, 

This was a transitional stage, leaving the Ligurian coast, traveling through Langhe to end at the ancient crossroads city of Pinerolo.

The peloton stayed together through the first hour of racing. Mickaël Buffaz formed the day's breakaway at the  mark. His maximum advantage over the main field was more than nine minutes, but he was easily caught. The finish was contested in a classic bunched sprint, won by Alessandro Petacchi, though this was one of his many 2007 wins that was later stripped due to his irregular salbutamol levels in a test given after this stage. Wet pavement in the final meters caused Nikolay Trusov to skid out and crash, taking many other riders down with him. Among them was race leader Andrea Noè, who tumbled across the finish line on his backside, but retained the pink jersey.

References

2007 Giro d'Italia
Giro d'Italia stages